Coyote Wash is a tributary stream of the Chaco River, on the Navajo Nation in San Juan County and McKinley County, New Mexico.

References

Rivers of San Juan County, New Mexico
Rivers of McKinley County, New Mexico
Rivers of New Mexico